Gustav Ipavec (15 August 1831 – 20 August 1908) was a Slovenian composer.  A native of Šentjur, he lived in that town for much of his life. He was a physician in his professional life; as a composer he wrote mainly small choral pieces for amateur performers. His son was the composer and physician Josip Ipavec; his brother, Benjamin Ipavec, was also a composer and physician.

See also
List of Slovenian composers

References
 "Ipavic Gustav". Slovenski biografski leksikon 1925–1991. Electronic edition. Ljubljana: Slovenian Academy of Sciences and Arts, 2009.

External links

1831 births
1908 deaths
Slovenian composers
Male composers
19th-century Slovenian physicians
People from Šentjur
Slovenian male musicians